The 1987 Hall of Fame Tennis Championships, also known as the 1987 Volvo Tennis Hall of Fame Championships for sponsorship reasons, was a men's tennis tournament played on outdoor grass courts and part of the Nabisco Grand Prix circuit. held. It was the 12th edition of the tournament and was held at the International Tennis Hall of Fame in Newport, Rhode Island, United States from July 6 through July 11, 1987. Unseeded Dan Goldie won the singles title and $20,000 first prize money.

Finals

Singles
 Dan Goldie defeated  Sammy Giammalva Jr. 6–7, 6–4, 6–4
 It was Goldie's first singles title of his career.

Doubles
 Dan Goldie /  Larry Scott defeated  Chip Hooper /  Mike Leach 6–3, 4–6, 6–4

See also
 1987 Virginia Slims of Newport – women's tournament

References

External links
 
 ATP tournament profile
 ITF tournament edition details

Hall Of Fame Tennis Championships, 1987
Hall of Fame Tennis Championships
Tennis
Hall of Fame Tennis Championships
Hall of Fame Tennis Championships